The 'Angie' mango is a named mango cultivar that originated in south Florida.

History 
The Angie cultivar was selected due to its relatively small growth habit, rich and complex flavor, and good disease resistance. It was named after Angela Whitman, wife of William Francis Whitman Jr., who was a founder and 1st President of The Rare Fruit Council International, Inc. (RFCI), Miami. Angela is a trustee of Fairchild Tropical Botanic Garden. 'Angie' was included as a Curator's Choice mango for the Fairchild Garden's 2010 mango festival. It was among several mangoes recommended by Fairchild's Curator of Tropical Fruit, Dr. Richard Campbell & Dr. Noris Ledesma, for home growers.

Description 
The flavor is rich and sweet.

The trees are considered semi-dwarf and easy to manage through pruning.

References 

Mango cultivars
Flora of Florida